Tuğlu is a village in the Kâhta District, Adıyaman Province, Turkey. The village is populated by Kurds of the Gewozî tribe and had a population of 487 in 2021.

The hamlets of Elmalı, Karmitli, Yenikoy, Yeşildirek and Yonca are attached to Tuğlu.

References

Villages in Kâhta District
Kurdish settlements in Adıyaman Province